West Essex is the far northwestern region of Essex County, New Jersey, United States, bordering Passaic County and Morris County.

It is considered to be one of the more affluent parts of the county, as opposed to the eastern Essex cities such as Newark, East Orange, and Irvington. As opposed to these city settings, West Essex are more suburban. Most of the municipalities have typically been white ethnically, where Newark and its bordering cities all have black majorities. West Essex also has substantial Hispanic and Asian populations. Places that separate Newark and East Orange from the West Essex area, such as South Orange, Maplewood, West Orange, Bloomfield, and Montclair have a balance of black and white people, and of different classes.

Municipalities 
Caldwell, West Caldwell, Roseland, Essex Fells, North Caldwell, and Fairfield share much history and culture having belonged to the Horseneck Tract.

The Caldwell and West Caldwell share a public school system with students in both municipalities attending James Caldwell High School in West Caldwell.  The other four communities each have their own school district through sixth grade, however, students from all four communities attend West Essex Regional Junior High School and West Essex High School, both in North Caldwell, from seventh through twelfth grade.

The six municipalities are covered by hyperlocal news site West Essex Now.

Residents within each of the six municipalities regularly travel between the communities.  Other services connect the area, for example, the West Caldwell public pools allow residents from the other five municipalities to become members for a higher fee, the three Caldwells share a post office, and emergency dispatching for Essex Fells is performed by North Caldwell.  Fairfield and West Caldwell share control over the Essex County Airport, which lies partially in both boroughs.  Residents of Essex Fells, which has no commercial or industrial sectors, depend on strong commercial and industrial sectors from the other five communities.

 Verona and Cedar Grove, between West Essex and Montclair, are part of the West Essex region as well, as they belonged to the Horseneck Tract, though the two communities are generally much more independent to themselves than the six communities to their west.
 Livingston, West Orange, and the Upper Montclair section of Montclair are also sometimes considered to be part of West Essex.  Their similarities to West Essex are based on the fact that small portions of all three towns were long ago part of the Horseneck Tract that makes up present-day West Essex.  Though the three towns border other West Essex towns and share similar socioeconomics, the majority of these towns, especially their downtown areas, developed as suburban offshoots of the city of Newark, not from Horseneck development in any major way. However, Livingston's local newspaper is called the West Essex Tribune.
 Millburn and Short Hills (a hamlet of Millburn) lie to the south of Livingston which itself is south of mainstream West Essex.  The town of Millburn, like Livingston, is geographically on the western border of Essex County.  However, it is usually not considered to be part of "West Essex", which implies the northwestern area of Essex County that was originally known as Horseneck.  The southwestern Essex County towns, like Livingston and Millburn, are generally considered to have developed as suburban Newark sprawl, as opposed to the Horseneck area which originally developed independently.

See also 
 West Essex Regional School District
 West Essex Park

References

Sources

External links
07004 History

Geography of Essex County, New Jersey
Regions of New Jersey